Live & Loud is a live album recorded by the former Black Sabbath singer Ozzy Osbourne, released on 28 June 1993. At the time, it was to be Osbourne's final album following Osbourne's final tour before retiring, aptly titled "No More Tours". The track "Black Sabbath" featured the original line-up of Black Sabbath, the members of which were invited to join Ozzy as guest stars for the Costa Mesa Reunion shows.

In addition to the standard release in a 'fat-boy' 2CD case, the album was released as a digipak with a metal 'speaker grille' cover and included tattoos, as well as the booklet; the official release was preceded by a single CD sampler issued as a promotional item.
A DVD of Live & Loud was also issued, one of the very first music compilation released in that format. The DVD is a compilation of live footage from several shows rather than a single concert: this is evident as Osbourne can be seen both shirtless and wearing different clothes during the same song, while guitarist Zakk Wylde can be seen playing up to three different guitars in the same song. The live recordings in the CD (with the exclusion of Wylde's guitar solo and Castillo's drum solo) are used as the soundtrack for the collage of performances in the video release, the only difference being in the selection of speeches with which Osbourne introduces some of the songs.

In 1994, Osbourne won a Grammy Award for Best Metal Performance for the live version of "I Don't Want to Change the World", featured on this album.

Due to ongoing legal litigation regarding song writing credits for the track, "Shot In The Dark", this album, along with The Ultimate Sin and Just Say Ozzy (both of which also included the song), were not remastered and reissued along with the rest of Ozzy's back catalog in 2002. However, the Grammy-winning live track, "I Don't Want to Change the World" from Live & Loud did appear on The Essential Ozzy Osbourne compilation released in 2003.

Track listing

Personnel 
 Ozzy Osbourne – vocals
 Zakk Wylde – guitar, piano on "Changes"
 Mike Inez – bass
 Randy Castillo – drums
 Kevin Jones – keyboards

Black Sabbath (performs on "Black Sabbath")
 Ozzy Osbourne – vocals
 Tony Iommi – guitar
 Geezer Butler – bass
 Bill Ward – drums

Production
 Mixed and engineered by Michael Wagener
 Mastered by Stephen Marcussen
 Remastered by Brian Lee with Bob Ludwig
 Liner notes by Steffan Chirazi

Charts

Album

Singles

Certifications

Awards 
36th Annual Grammy Awards

References

External links
 

Ozzy Osbourne live albums
1993 live albums
Epic Records live albums
1993 video albums
Live video albums
Epic Records video albums